Chris Heid (born March 14, 1983) is a dual Canadian-German professional ice hockey defenceman. He most recently played for ERC Ingolstadt of the Deutsche Eishockey Liga.

Heid was drafted 74th overall in the 2001 NHL Entry Draft by the Minnesota Wild. On September 1, 2011, Heid left Augsburger Panther after two seasons, and joined rival ERC Ingolstadt on a two-year contract.

Career statistics

References

External links

1983 births
Living people
Augsburger Panther players
Cleveland Barons (2001–2006) players
Eisbären Berlin players
ERC Ingolstadt players
Fresno Falcons players
Houston Aeros (1994–2013) players
Krefeld Pinguine players
Louisiana IceGators (ECHL) players
Minnesota Wild draft picks
Pensacola Ice Pilots players
Spokane Chiefs players
Canadian ice hockey defencemen
Canadian expatriate ice hockey players in Germany